Fassbinder's Women (German: Für mich gab's nur noch Fassbinder)  is a 2000 German documentary film directed by Rosa von Praunheim. For example, the film was shown at the Locarno Festival in 2000 and at the Outfest in Los Angeles in 2001.

Plot
The film consists of several interviews with men and women from the private and professional environment of the German film director Rainer Werner Fassbinder. Rosa von Praunheim gets to the bottom of her relationship with the director, who is said to have been a difficult and eccentric man who did not spare his actors and often treated them badly. Fassbinder's companions usually have an ambivalent relationship with him, since they admired him on the other hand and often had him to thank for their success.

Reception
"As in many of his films, Praunheim's documentary gaze exposes the cliché and thus makes it possible to see the 'Fassbinder phenomenon' in a new way. Praunheim's examination of Fassbinder thus becomes an important piece of German film history." (Prisma Magazin)

References

External links

Films directed by Rosa von Praunheim
Documentary films about film directors and producers
2000 films
2000 documentary films
2000s German films
Rainer Werner Fassbinder